Kara-Künggöy is a village in the Naryn Region of Kyrgyzstan. It is part of the Kochkor District. Its population was 2,016 in 2021.

References
 

Populated places in Naryn Region